State Road 288 (NM 288) is a  state highway in the US state of New Mexico. NM 288's western terminus is at NM 268 in Weber City, and the eastern terminus is at NM 209 north of Clovis.

Major intersections

See also

References

288
Transportation in Curry County, New Mexico